The Shaman Tour was the thirty-second concert tour promoting the band's 2002 album Shaman.

Touring personnel

Band:
 Carlos Santana – lead guitar, percussion, vocals
 Chester D. Thompson – keyboards
 Benny Rietveld – bass guitar
 Karl Perazzo – timbales, percussion, vocals
 Raul Rekow – congas, bongos, percussion, vocals
 Dennis Chambers – drums
 Tony Lindsay – lead vocals
 Andy Vargas – lead vocals
 Jeff Cresman – trombone
 Bill Ortiz – trumpet
 Myron Dove – rhythm guitar

Management:
 Kevin Chisholm – tour manager
 Adam Fells – assistant tour manager
 Mike Hoss Kiefer – production manager
 Chad Koehler – stage manager
 Andy Elias – set/lighting designer
 Chad Wilson – security
 Steve Brown – venue security

Production:
 Kathy Beer – lighting director
 Randy Piotroski – foh sound
 Brian Montgomery – monitors
 Jason Ruggles – sound engineer
 Jim Gaines - sound consultant

Crew:
 Ed Adair – guitar tech
 Dave Crockett – drum & percussion tech
 Chris "Stubby" McNair – bass & rhythm tech
 Rob Diaz – keyboard tech

Set list 
An average set list of this tour is as follows:

 "Jin-go-lo-ba" (Babatunde Olatunji)
 "We Got Latin Soul" (Arlester "Dyke" Christian)
 "Aye Aye Aye"	(Michael Shrieve, Carlos Santana, Karl Perazzo, Raul Rekow)
 "Put Your Lights On" (Erik Schrody)
 "Victory Is Won" (Santana)
 "Maria Maria" (Santana, Perazzo, Rekow, Wyclef Jean, Jerry Duplessis)
 "Concierto de Aranjuez" (Joaquín Rodrigo)
 "Foo Foo" (Yvon André, Roger Eugène, Yves Joseph, Hermann Nau, Claude Jean)
 "Adouma" (Angélique Kidjo, Jean Hebrail)
 "Sideways" (Clarence Greenwood)
 "The Game of Love" (Gregg Alexander, Rick Nowels)
 "Spiritual" (John Coltrane)
 "(Da Le) Yaleo" (Santana, Shakara Mutela, Christian Polloni)
 "Apache" (Jerry Lordan)
 "Smooth" (Itaal Shur, Rob Thomas)
 "Dame Tu Amor" (Abraham Quintanilla, Ricky Vela, Richard Brooks)
 "Black Magic Woman" (Peter Green)
 "Gypsy Queen" (Gábor Szabó)
Encore
 "Oye Como Va" (Tito Puente)
 "Hey Boogie Woman" (Bill Bartlett)
 "Novus" (Santana, Szabó, Walter Afanasieff, Greg DiGiovine, Ritchie Rome)

Tour dates

U.S. show (October 29, 2002)

European tour (December 3–16, 2002)

U.S. leg (February 9–21, 2003)

Oceanic leg (March 21 – April 6, 2003)

Asian leg (November 1–11, 2003)

North American leg (November 14, 2003 – May 1, 2004)

Italian show (May 16, 2004)

U.S. leg (June 6–24, 2004)

European leg (July 2, 2004)

U.S. leg (September 30 – October 2, 2004)

Box office score data

Notes

References

External links 
 Santana Past Shows 2002 at Santana official website
 Santana Past Shows 2003 at Santana official website
 Santana Past Shows 2004 at Santana official website

Santana (band) concert tours
2002 concert tours
2003 concert tours
2004 concert tours
Concert tours of North America
Concert tours of Europe
Concert tours of Oceania
Concert tours of Asia